The Whittaker MW5 Sorcerer is a British amateur-built aircraft that was designed by Mike Whittaker in the mid-1980s and supplied as plans for amateur construction.

Design and development
The aircraft features a strut-braced parasol wing, a single-seat open cockpit, fixed conventional landing gear and a single engine in tractor configuration, mounted on the keel tube, above the cockpit.

Whittaker MW5 Sorcerer is made from aluminium tubing, with its flying surfaces covered in doped aircraft fabric. The standard engine used is the  Rotax 447 two-stroke powerplant.

The design is approved by the Light Aircraft Association in the UK.

Variants

MW5A
Initial version
MW5D
Model with folding wings and the same wing area as the "A" model
MW5K
Seaplane version with a single monohull Full Lotus inflatable float and wing tip pontoons
MW7
Aerobatic version with shorter wingspan

Specifications (MW5A Sorcerer)

References

External links

Photo of Whittaker MW5D Sorcerer

Homebuilt aircraft
1980s British civil utility aircraft
Single-engined tractor aircraft
Parasol-wing aircraft